Sappho 31 is an archaic Greek lyric poem by the ancient Greek  poet Sappho of the island of Lesbos.  The poem is also known as phainetai moi (φαίνεταί μοι) after the opening words of its first line.  It is one of Sappho's most famous poems, describing her love for a young woman.

Fragment 31 has been the subject of numerous translations and adaptations from ancient times to the present day.  Celebrated for its portrayal of intense emotion, the poem has influenced modern conceptions of lyric poetry, and its depiction of desire continues to influence writers today.

Preservation
Fragment 31 was one of the few substantial fragments of Sappho to survive from ancient times, preserved in the first-century AD treatise on aesthetics On the Sublime.  Four stanzas are well-preserved, followed by part of one more line; this, as well as Catullus' adaptation of the poem, suggests that there was originally one more stanza of the poem, often thought to have been Sappho resigning herself to the situation in which she finds herself.  A reconstruction of the poem by classicist Armand D'Angour suggests that the original poem may have had up to 8 stanzas.

The opening words of the poem ("To me it seems that man...") are almost identical to a fragment of Sappho quoted by Apollonius Dyscolus: "To himself he seems".  This might have been an alternative opening to Sappho 31.

Poem
Fragment 31 is composed in Sapphic stanzas, a metrical form named after Sappho and consisting of stanzas of three long followed by one short line.  Four strophes of the poem survive, along with a few words of a fifth.  The poem is written in the Aeolic dialect, which was the dialect spoken in Sappho's time on her home island of Lesbos.

The poem centres around three characters: a man and a woman, both otherwise unidentified, and the speaker. 

The context of the poem has been the subject of much scholarly debate: Thomas McEvilley calls it the "central controversy" about the poem.  Wilamowitz suggested that the poem was a wedding song, and that the man mentioned in the initial stanza of the poem was the bridegroom.  A poem in the Greek Anthology which echoes the first stanza of the poem is explicitly about a wedding; this perhaps strengthens the argument that fragment 31 was written as a wedding song.  Since the second half of the twentieth century, scholars have tended to follow Denys Page in dismissing this argument. William Race, for instance, says that the poem contains nothing to indicate that it is about a wedding, while Christina Clark argues that, though the interaction between the two characters observed by the speaker indicates that they are of similar social status, their interaction is likely to be compatible with a number of possible relationships, not just that between a bride and groom.  For instance, she suggests that they might just as well be brother and sister.

One interpretation suggests that the man's precise relationship with the woman is not important. Instead, the man's role is to act as a "contrast figure", designed to highlight Sappho's love for the girl by juxtaposing the strength of Sappho's emotional reaction with his impassivity. For instance, John Winkler argues that "'That man' in poem 31 is like the military armament in poem 16, an introductory set-up to be dismissed".

As far back as the eighteenth century, it has been proposed that the poem is about Sappho's jealousy of the man who sits with her beloved.  Though this is still a popular interpretation of the poem, many critics deny that the fragment is about jealousy at all.  Anne Carson argues that Sappho has no wish to take the man's place, nor is she concerned that he will usurp hers: thus, she is not jealous of him, but amazed at his ability to retain his composure so close to the object of her desire.  Another common interpretation of the poem is that it is primarily concerned with expressing the speaker's love for the girl.  Joan DeJean criticises the "jealousy" interpretation of the poem as intended to play down the homoeroticism of the poem.

Armand D'Angour argues that the phrase "αλλα παν τολματον" means "all must be dared", rather than "endured" as it is sometimes translated.  First translations of the poem would derive from Catullus' re-visitation of the poem, Catullus 51, painting Sappho with a green taint of jealousy. A more conservative reading would on the other hand offer as a secondary option the change of tone in the poem towards a more hopeful, rather than resigned, position.

A philological debate has also arisen concerning the very first words of the poem "phainetai moi" (φαίνεταί μοι); the most popular interpretation would read the first stanza of the poem as a true banner of lyricism, the use of the first word to introduce the subject of Sappho's alleged jealousy. An alternative reading is suggested by Gallavotti: according to his thesis, the text was corrupted over time as a result of the disappearance of the sound [w] (represented by the letter digamma Ϝ) and Sappho's original would have instead said "phainetai woi" (φαίνεταί Ϝοι). This reading of the original text, which may be supported by a quote by Apollonius Dyscolus, would dramatically change the perspective of the first verse, its translation roughly being: "God-like he esteems himself to be". The speaker is then counter-posing her own experience in contrast with the man's and the next three stanzas describe the symptoms the narrator experiences "whenever I glance at you for a second". The final surviving line, 17, has been thought to be the beginning of a stanza describing Sappho reconciling herself to the situation in which she found herself.

In 1970, an article by Hungarian-French psychoanalyst George Devereux suggested that what Sappho is describing here is a seizure, pointing that the symptoms listed in the fragment are the same symptoms of an anxiety attack. He also, on these very basis, supported Cobet's conjecture πέπαγε  instead of †καμ† ... †ἔαγε† in line 9.

Reception and influence

Fragment 31 is one of Sappho's most famous works. It is one of her most frequently adapted and translated poems, and has been the subject of more scholarly commentary than any other of her works.  In the ancient world, the Roman poet Catullus adapted it into his 51st poem, putting his muse Lesbia into the role of Sappho's beloved.  Other ancient authors who adapted the poem include Theocritus, in his second Idyll, and Apollonius of Rhodes, in his description of the first meeting between Jason and Medea in the Argonautica.  In the nineteenth century, the poem began to be seen as an exemplar of Romantic lyric, influencing poets such as Tennyson, whose "Eleänore" and "Fatima" were both inspired by fragment 31.  Other Romantic poets influenced by the fragment include Shelley and Keats – for instance in "To Constantia, singing" and "Ode to a Nightingale", respectively.

Sappho's description of the physical response to desire in this poem is especially celebrated.  The poem is quoted in Longinus's treatise On the Sublime for the intensity of its emotion, Plato draws on it in Socrates' second speech on love in the Phaedrus, and the physical symptoms of desire portrayed in the poem continue to be used to convey the feeling in modern culture.

Notes

References

Works cited

External links
28 translations and paraphrases
Sappho: Fragment 31, William S. Annis, Aoidoi.org, July 18, 2004

Ancient Greek poems
LGBT poetry
Works by Sappho
Love poems